Mike Wiggs (25 April 1938 – 8 December 2011) was a British middle-distance runner. He competed in the men's 1500 metres at the 1960 Summer Olympics and in the men's 5,000 metres at the 1964 Summer Olympics.

References

External links
 

1938 births
2011 deaths
Athletes (track and field) at the 1960 Summer Olympics
Athletes (track and field) at the 1964 Summer Olympics
British male middle-distance runners
British male long-distance runners
Olympic athletes of Great Britain
Place of birth missing
Members of Thames Valley Harriers